Bali may refer to any of several languages:
Balinese language, spoken in Indonesia, especially the island of Bali
Bali language (Adamawa), spoken in Demsa, Adamawa, Nigeria
Bali language (DRC), a Bantu language spoken in the Democratic Republic of the Congo
East Teke language, a member of the Teke dialect continuum of the Congolese plateau
 Bali (Li) dialect of Nga'ka language (Cameroon)
Uneapa language (sometimes called "Bali"), spoken in Bali Island, Papua New Guinea